Frasne station is a railway station located in Frasne, Doubs, France. The station was opened on 10 June 1855 and is located on the Dijon–Vallorbe and Frasne–Les Verrières lines. The train services are operated by SNCF and Swiss Federal Railways.

Services 
The following services stop at Frasne:

References

External links 
 
 

Railway stations in France opened in 1855
Railway stations in Doubs